The Jewish Institute for National Security of America (JINSA), formerly named the Jewish Institute for National Security Affairs, is a Washington, D.C.-based, non-profit and pro-Israeli lobby and think tank. It was founded in 1976 focusing on issues of national security, advocating that Israel can play an important role in bolstering democracy. It claims it has a membership of 20,000.

JINSA's stated aim is to:

Provide leadership and affect policy on crucial issues of national security and foreign policy; to promote American security cooperation with like-minded allies including, but not limited to, Israel; to engage the American defense community about the role Israel can and does play in securing Western, democratic interests in the Middle East and Mediterranean regions; and to improve awareness in the general public, as well as in the Jewish community of the importance of a strong American defense capability.

JINSA's advisory board includes former United States Senators Joe Lieberman (I-CT) and Rudy Boschwitz (R-MN), General James T. Conway, and Chief William J. McSweeney of the Los Angeles County Sheriff's Department, while Vice President Dick Cheney, former National Security Advisor and former U.S. Representative to the United Nations John Bolton, and former Undersecretary of Defense for Policy Douglas Feith were all on JINSA's Board of Advisors before they entered the Bush administration. JINSA is a non-partisan organization welcoming advisors from both major political parties. It includes Democrats such as former Congressman Dave McCurdy and former Congresswoman Shelley Berkley.

Foreign policy positions

The Gemunder Center for Defense and Strategy

JINSA's Gemunder Center for Defense and Strategy is JINSA's policy center. Opened in 2013, the Gemunder Center performs research and advocacy on U.S. defense, strategic and general national security issues. The center's policy projects include:

The U.S.-Israel Security Policy Project- The U.S.-Israel Security Policy Project examines the various ways to strengthen the U.S.-Israel security relationship amid dramatic regional changes to meet growing dangers and capitalize on new opportunities. Admiral James Stavridis is the chairman of this project.
The Jordan Valley Policy Project - JINSA’s Jordan Valley Policy Project examines the strategic importance of Israeli sovereignty in the Jordan Valley for Israel’s self-defense, U.S. national security interests and stability in the Middle East.
The Iran Policy Project - Examining the strategic, economic and military options available to the United States to prevent Iran from acquiring nuclear weapons capability and counteract its destabilizing aggression against the United States and its allies. The Co-Chairs of this project are Ambassador Eric Edelman and General Charles F. Wald, USAF (Ret.).
The Eastern Mediterranean Policy Project - The Eastern Mediterranean Policy Project was established by JINSA to examine evolving threats and opportunities, and to provide recommendations, for U.S. policy toward the region, including Turkey’s increasingly aggressive posture, the return of great power competition and significant energy discoveries. The Co-Chairs of this project are Ambassador Eric Edelman and General Charles F. Wald, USAF (Ret.).
The Hybrid Warfare Policy Project - The Hybrid Warfare Policy Project defines the requirements of the law of armed conflict (LOAC) and to evaluate the performance of the U.S., Israeli, and other allied militaries in compliance with – and sometimes, beyond – the dictates of that law. At the same time, the Policy Project seeks to focus attention on the conduct of hybrid adversaries such as Hezbollah, Hamas, and Islamic State, which often intentionally exploit that same body of law to stymie U.S., Israeli, and allied forces in battle and to discredit their self-defense operations in the forum of public opinion.
The Gaza Assessment Policy Project - The strategy that Hamas employed in the 2014 Gaza War represents the new face of war that threatens to undermine the effectiveness of conventional militaries, endangers civilians in irregular conflicts, and distorts the international legal structure. The Gaza Assessment Policy Project closely studies the evolution of this strategy and Israel’s response, based on primary source research and discussions with senior Israeli, Palestinian, and United Nations (U.N.) officials.

The EMP Policy Project - Convenes former high-ranking government and military officials, directors of national laboratories, nuclear engineers and other experts to raise awareness and develop actionable recommendations to enhance U.S. strategic deterrence, critical infrastructure and societal resiliency against the spectrum of electromagnetic threats. Co-Chairs of this Task Force include Ambassador Robert Joseph, former Under Secretary of State for Arms Control and International Security and Dr. Bryan Gabbard, Executive Vice President, Defense Group Inc.

Other policy recommendations

JINSA's policy recommendations for the U.S. government have included:

 National ballistic missile defense systems.
 Curbing of regional ballistic missile development and production worldwide.
 Increased counterterrorism training and funding, prior to September 11, 2001 attacks.
 Increased defense cooperation with Israel.
 Substantially improved quality-of-life for U.S. service personnel and their families.
 Support for joint U.S.-Israeli training and weapons development programs.
 Bilateral mutual defense treaty with Israel is more narrowly defined than other such security pacts with fifty other U.S. partners.

JINSA supported President George W. Bush's policies in two regards, advocating the need for regime change in Iraq, cultivating close ties with Ahmed Chalabi. and supporting American funding for opposition groups in Iran.

JINSA has supported Azerbaijan in its war against Armenia as a means to weaken Iran. JINSA president Michael Makovsky has stated in a conversation with the Azerbaijani ambassador to the United States: "Whatever it's worth, at JINSA, we believe that America has stronger strategic ties with Azerbaijan."

Programs

Generals and Admirals Program to Israel
One of JINSA's most important programs is to invite, with the assistance of the Pentagon and the U.S. Department of State, retired U.S. senior military officers to Israel. The Generals and Admirals Program includes meetings with Israeli political and military leaders.

More than 200 retired admirals and generals, including shock and awe theorist Adm. Leon "Bud" Edney, USN, Lt. Gen. Jay Garner, USA, Maj. Gen. David L. Grange, USA, Maj. Gen. Jarvis Lynch, USMC, Maj. Gen. Sidney Shachnow, USA, Adm. Leighton "Snuffy" Smith, USN, Adm. Carlisle Trost, USN and Brig. Gen. Thomas E. White, USA, have participated in the trips over the last 21 years. Participation in the program makes no requirements of the invitees to make statements, form opinions or maintain any further relationship with JINSA, yet many trip alums have participated more than once, and 50 past participants co-authored a statement on violence in the Palestinian-controlled territories that appeared in The New York Times in October 2000.

, writing in left-leaning The Nation, describes the program this way:
The bulk of JINSA's modest annual budget is spent on taking a bevy of retired US generals and admirals to Israel, where JINSA facilitates meetings between Israeli officials and the still-influential US flag officers, who, upon their return to the States, happily write op-eds and sign letters and advertisements championing the Likudnik line.

Other retired flag grade U.S. military officers recruited by JINSA include: Lt. Gen. Anthony Burshnick (USAF), Gen. Crosbie Saint (USA), Maj. Gen. Lee Downer (USAF), Gen. John Foss (USA), Adm. David Jeremiah (USN), Adm. Jerome Johnson (USN), and Rear Adm. Sumner Shapiro (USN).

Military Academies Program
In Israel, the JINSA Military Academies Program is a two-week program for cadets and midshipmen attending the U.S. Military Academy, the U.S. Naval Academy, the U.S. Air Force, and the U.S. Coast Guard Academy. The program builds bridges for future associations between the U.S. Armed Forces and the Israel Defense Forces (IDF). At each academy, participants are selected in a competitive process by supervising faculty and receive academic credit for the program.

During the course of the program, the cadets and midshipmen engage in activities and discussions with young Israeli military officers, highlighting the role of the military in democratic countries, and similarities and differences in officer development. In the process, they visit six IDF bases. The cadets and midshipmen also meet with experts from academia, think tanks, and the private sector to receive briefings covering a broad spectrum of subjects related to security, society, and contemporary life in Israel. They also learn about the Israel's history and current events in the Middle East.

The program also includes activities designed to introduce the cadets and midshipmen to the many cultures that make up Israeli society, and organize visits to historic and religious sites.

Homeland Security Program
In 2002 JINSA initiated a program called LEEP (Law Enforcement Exchange Program) aimed at exchanging counter-terrorism experience and tactics between U.S. law enforcement agencies and their counterparts in the Israeli National Police. The primary focus of the program is to bring U.S. law enforcement executives (police chiefs, sheriffs, etc.) to Israel for an intensive program aimed at educating U.S. officials on techniques for countering domestic terrorism in the United States. From 2002 to 2020 over 200 U.S. federal, state, county and municipal law enforcement executives have been enrolled in the program, involving visits to Israel, together with thousands of US security personnel attending conferences where visiting Israeli experts have spoken. According to Max Blumenthal in his book The Management of Savagery, JINSA has claimed that it has overseen the training of over 9,000 US police officials by Israeli-led experts. Blumenthal cited one US enforcement superintendent in 2004 these exchanges changed the way Homeland Security was being organized in New Jersey. The US-Israeli anthropologist, Jeff Halper co-founder of ICAHD and supporter of the BDS movement, in an article for Mondoweiss criticized these programmes, as based on military techniques developed to control the Palestinians in the Israeli occupied territories, as threatening to lead to an 'Israelization' of American police forces and a concomitant 'Palestinization' of the American people.

Publications

JINSA publishes U.S. policy-related publications including the semi-annual political magazine Journal of International Security Affairs. From 2016 the magazine became a free publication. For 22 years, JINSA published Security Affairs - a monthly newsletter. Apart from magazines and newsletters, the institute also publishes conference proceedings and monographs. In 2004, JINSA published a reference book: Profiles in Terror: A Guide to Middle East Terrorist Organizations by Aaron Mannes.

Awards
Each fall, JINSA presents an annual Henry M. "Scoop" Jackson Distinguished Service Award, named in honor of the late-Senator Henry M. "Scoop" Jackson to U.S. government leaders (generally a senior U.S. Government or Armed Forces official, a Senator or two Members of the United States House of Representatives) for their career dedication to U.S. national security. Past honorees have included: 

 1982: Senator Henry M. "Scoop" Jackson
 1984: Ambassador Jeane J. Kirkpatrick
 1985: Congressman Jack Kemp
 1986: Senator Rudy Boschwitz
 1987: Ambassador Max Kampelman
 1988: Admiral William J. Crowe Jr., USN, Chairman, Joint Chiefs of Staff
 1989: Professor Eugene V. Rostow
 1990: Senator Connie Mack
 1991: Dick Cheney, Secretary of Defense
 1992: Congressman Les Aspin
 1993: Congressman John P. Murtha
 1994: Senator Daniel K. Inouye
 1995: Senator Ted Stevens
 1996: Congressman Duncan Hunter and Congressman Norm Dicks
 1997: Senator Joe Lieberman
 1998: Senator John Warner
 1999: Congressman Ike Skelton and Congressman Curt Weldon
 2000: Senator Max Cleland
 2001: Gordon England, Secretary of the Navy, Dr. James Roche, Secretary of the Air Force, Thomas E. White, Secretary of the Army
 2002: Paul Wolfowitz, Deputy Secretary of Defense
 2003: Congresswoman Jane Harman and Congressman Jim Saxton
 2004: Senator Evan Bayh
 2005: General Peter Pace, USMC, Chairman, Joint Chiefs of Staff
 2006: Senator John McCain
 2007: Robert Gates, Secretary of Defense
 2008: Admiral Michael Mullen, USN, Chairman, Joint Chiefs of Staff
 2009: Army Gen. George W. Casey Jr., Army chief of staff; Marine Corps Gen. James T. Conway, Marine Corps commandant; Navy Adm. Gary Roughead, chief of naval operations; Coast Guard Adm. Thad W. Allen, Coast Guard commandant; Air Force Gen. Norton A. Schwartz, Air Force chief of staff; and Navy Adm. Eric T. Olson, commander of U.S. Special Operations Command.
 2010: Senator Jon Kyl
 2011: NATO Supreme Allied Commander Admiral James G. Stavridis
 2012: Senator Lindsey Graham
 2013: Senator Mark Kirk
 2014: Congressman Mac Thornberry
 2015: Congressman Ed Royce

In addition, beginning in 2003, JINSA has honored six enlisted representatives of the U.S. Armed Services and U.S. Special Operations Command, each selected by their respective services, with the "Grateful Nation Award" for duty that, while exemplary, might otherwise go unrecognized.

History
Founded in 1976 as a result of the lessons learned from the 1973 Yom Kippur War, JINSA communicates with the national security establishment and the general public to explain the role Israel can and does play in bolstering American interests, and the link between American defense policy and the security of Israel. JINSA's founding, according to Jason Vest, was prompted by "neoconservatives concerned that the United States might not be able to provide Israel with adequate military supplies in the event of another Arab-Israeli war."

In the late 1980s, JINSA underwent a profound repurposing of mission which, although retaining the interest in maintaining and strengthening the U.S.–Israeli defense relationship, widened its focus to general U.S. defense and foreign policy, with missions and meetings with national leaders and officials Ethiopia, Belgium, South Korea, India, Bulgaria, Italy, the Republic of China, Uzbekistan, Costa Rica, Spain, Eritrea, Jordan, the People's Republic of China, Hungary, United Kingdom and Germany.

JINSA, a charitable 501(c)(3) organization, maintains a staunchly non-partisan stance in its official policies and statements.

See also
 American Israel Public Affairs Committee
 American Jewish Committee
 Foreign policy interest group
 Jewish Council for Public Affairs
 Military history of Jewish Americans
 Saban Center for Middle East Policy
 The Conference of Presidents of Major American Jewish Organizations
 Washington Institute for Near East Policy

References

External links
 

Jews and Judaism in Washington, D.C.
Think tanks based in Washington, D.C.
Foreign policy and strategy think tanks in the United States
Political and economic think tanks in the United States
New Right organizations (United States)
Think tanks established in 1976
Israel–United States relations
United States–Middle Eastern relations
Middle Eastern studies in the United States
Jewish-American political organizations
501(c)(3) organizations
1976 establishments in Washington, D.C.
Jewish organizations based in the United States
Non-profit organizations based in Washington, D.C.
Pro-Israel political advocacy groups in the United States